Damian Nawrocik (born 3 July 1980, in Poznań) is a Polish professional football player. In his Senior Career he played for Lech Poznan and Arka Gdynia. At the age of 36 still remains as a respected and talented player, currently playing for Polonia Sroda Wielkopolska.

Career

Club
On 9 February 2006, he moved to Arka Gdynia from Lech Poznań.
In August 2009, he moved to ŁKS Łódź.
In the summer 2010, he joined KSZO Ostrowiec on a one-year deal.

References

External links
 
 

1980 births
Living people
Polish footballers
Lech Poznań players
Warta Poznań players
Arka Gdynia players
ŁKS Łódź players
KSZO Ostrowiec Świętokrzyski players
Jarota Jarocin players
Polonia Środa Wielkopolska players
Footballers from Poznań
Association football forwards